Yarden Mayersohn (born 21 June 1993) is an Israeli judoka.

She is the bronze medallist of the 2018 Judo Grand Prix Agadir in the -78 kg category.

References

External links
 
 
 

1993 births
Living people
Israeli female judoka
European Games competitors for Israel
Judoka at the 2019 European Games